The city of Chennai is classified into three regions: North Chennai, Central Chennai and South Chennai. It is further divided into 15 zones, consisting of 200 wards.

References

Geography of Chennai
Chennai-related lists